Barbaloba is a genus of moths in the family Blastobasidae.

Species
Barbaloba jubae Adamski, 2013
Barbaloba meleagrisellae Adamski, 2013

Etymology
The generic name is derived from the Latin words barba (meaning beard) and lobus (meaning a rounded projection) and refers to the setose lobelike process originating from the ventral part of the valva of the male genitalia.

References

Blastobasidae genera
Blastobasidae